The Dragon's Wrath is an out-of-print collectible card game by Fournier Naipes. It was released in 1995 in France but had a small English print run. The base set had 134 cards. It had one other English expansion, also released in 1995, called Mercedarian and it contained 90 cards. A final expansion, titled El Enigma del la Ira was published in Spanish, and as Enigma in German.

The game story was nearly identical to Magic: the Gathering because it was a battle between two dueling wizards that used mana of four different colors. The game also had a unique effect where creatures could carry "Objects" if they had the "Hand" symbol. If one of your creatures killed a creature carrying an Object, they could begin carrying the Object so long as they had a Hand symbol too.

References

Collectible card games
Card games introduced in 1995